Manhattan Melodrama is a 1934 American pre-Code crime film, produced by MGM, directed by W. S. Van Dyke, and starring Clark Gable, William Powell, and Myrna Loy. The movie also provided one of Mickey Rooney's earliest film roles. (Rooney played Gable's character as a child.) The film is based on a story by Arthur Caesar, who won the Academy Award for Best Original Story. It was also the first of Myrna Loy and William Powell's fourteen screen pairings.

Notorious criminal John Dillinger attended a showing of the film at Chicago's Biograph Theater on July 22, 1934. After leaving the theater, he was shot to death by federal agents. Myrna Loy was among those who expressed distaste at the studio's willingness to exploit this event for the financial benefit of the film. Scenes from Manhattan Melodrama, in addition to Dillinger's death, are depicted in the 2009 film Public Enemies starring Johnny Depp as Dillinger.

Plot
On June 15, 1904, the steamboat General Slocum catches fire and sinks in New York's East River. Two boys, Blackie Gallagher (Mickey Rooney) and Jim Wade (Jimmy Butler), are rescued by a priest, Father Joe (Leo Carrillo), but are orphaned by the disaster. They are taken in by another survivor, Poppa Rosen (George Sidney), who lost his young son in the sinking. The boys live with Poppa Rosen for a short while; then Rosen, a Russian Jew, is trampled to death by a policeman's horse after he heckles Leon Trotsky at a Communist rally and a melee breaks out.

The boys remain close friends, though their lives diverge. Studious from the very beginning, Jim (played as an adult by William Powell) gets his law degree and eventually becomes the assistant district attorney. Blackie is a cheerful, happy-go-lucky kid who loves to throw dice and trick other kids out of their money. Played as an adult by Clark Gable, he becomes the owner of a fancy, albeit illegal, casino. Though regularly "raided", the cops have been paid off and the casino resumes business immediately after they leave. Blackie's girlfriend Eleanor (Myrna Loy) loves him, but pleads with him in vain to marry her and give up his dangerous life.

Jim is elected district attorney. Blackie, always a supporter and admirer of Jim, knowing the latter's incorruptibility, arranges to meet him for a celebration, but something comes up, and he sends Eleanor to keep Jim company at the Cotton Club until he can join them. Jim and Eleanor talk the night away. Afterward, she gives Blackie one last chance to marry her and settle down. When Blackie refuses, she leaves him.

Months later, Jim and Eleanor meet by chance and start keeping company (she informs Jim that she has not seen Blackie for months). Meanwhile, Blackie, who acknowledges that he is a changed man (due to Eleanor's having left him), coldly kills Manny Arnold (Noel Madison) for not paying his gambling debts. Jim summons him to his office, where he tells him that he and Eleanor are going to get married. Blackie is sincerely happy for both of them. Jim also informs his friend that he is a suspect in the Arnold murder. However, there is no real evidence, so the crime goes unsolved.

Jim invites him to be the best man at his wedding.  Blackie initially accepts but later sends a telegram begging off. After returning from his honeymoon, Jim runs for governor of New York. Snow (Thomas E. Jackson), who had been his chief assistant until Jim fired him for corruption, threatens to tell reporters that Jim covered up for Blackie in the Arnold case. Although untrue, this would cost Jim a close race for the governorship. By chance, Blackie and Eleanor meet at the horse track. Eleanor tells Blackie about Snow. Blackie shoots Snow dead in a washroom of Madison Square Garden during a hockey game. A beggar who pretends to be blind sees him leave the scene of the crime. Jim has no choice but to prosecute Blackie. Blackie is convicted and sentenced to death.

Jim wins the election, partly because the public sees that he is so honest he is prosecuting his own childhood friend. Eleanor tries to get him to commute the sentence to life imprisonment, revealing Blackie's motive for killing Snow, but that only makes things worse. When Jim remains steadfast, Eleanor leaves him. At the last moment, Jim hurries to Sing Sing Prison and meets Blackie, together with Father Joe, who is now the prison's chaplain. Jim finally offers to commute the death sentence, but Blackie turns him down. (He admits to the murder of Manny Arnold.) Father Joe leads Blackie to the electric chair while saying last rites.

A few days later, Jim calls a special joint session of the New York Legislature. He reveals how the murder helped him win the election, and how at the end he compromised his principles and was willing to commute his friend's sentence. He then tenders his resignation. When he leaves, Eleanor is waiting for him. She tells him that she was wrong about him, and they leave together to start a new life.

Cast

 Clark Gable as Edward J."Blackie" Gallagher
 William Powell as Jim Wade
 Myrna Loy as Eleanor Packer
 Leo Carrillo as Father Joe
 Nat Pendleton as Spud
 George Sidney as Poppa Rosen
 Isabel Jewell as Annabelle
 Muriel Evans as Tootsie Malone
 Thomas E. Jackson as Asst. Dist. Atty. Richard Snow

 Isabelle Keith as Miss Adams, Jim's Secretary
 Frank Conroy as Blackie's Lawyer
 Noel Madison as Manny Arnold
 Jimmy Butler as Jim Wade as a Boy
 Mickey Rooney as Blackie as a Boy
 Shirley Ross as Black Cotton Club Singer
 George Irving as Campaign Manager (uncredited)
 Leonid Kinskey as Trotskyite (uncredited)
 Edward Van Sloan as Yacht Capt. Swenson (uncredited)

Cast notes
Manhattan Melodrama was the only film that Clark Gable and William Powell made together, but both men were married to Carole Lombard. Lombard was married to Powell when she made her only film with Clark Gable, No Man of Her Own.

Reception
Filmed relatively quickly and with a modest budget, Manhattan Melodrama was expected to return a profit but not to capture the imagination of the public. The picture's smash hit success surprised the studio and made major stars of screen veterans Myrna Loy and William Powell in the first of their fourteen screen pairings, and also solidified the success of MGM's most popular male lead, Clark Gable. The film has a Harlem nightclub scene featuring Shirley Ross in blackface singing a song called "The Bad in Every Man." After the film's release, the lyrics were rewritten by Lorenz Hart as the retitled "Blue Moon". On review aggregator website Rotten Tomatoes, the film holds an approval rating of 80% with an average rating of 7.04/10, based on 15 contemporary reviews.

According to MGM records, the film earned $735,000 in the U.S. and Canada and $498,000 elsewhere resulting in a profit of $415,000.

Radio adaptation
Manhattan Melodrama was presented on Lux Radio Theatre on September 9, 1940. William Powell, Myrna Loy and Don Ameche starred in the adaptation.

See also
 General Slocum disaster

References

External links
 
 
 
 
 Manhattan Melodrama on Lux Radio Theater: September 9, 1940

1934 films
1934 crime drama films
American black-and-white films
American crime drama films
Films about capital punishment
Films directed by W. S. Van Dyke
Films produced by David O. Selznick
Films set in 1904
Films set in 1920
Films set in 1923
Films set in Manhattan
Films set in New York City
Films that won the Academy Award for Best Story
John Dillinger
Metro-Goldwyn-Mayer films
Films with screenplays by Donald Ogden Stewart
Films with screenplays by Joseph L. Mankiewicz
1930s English-language films
1930s American films